Yesim Servet Uzunlar, known as Servet Uzunlar, (born 8 March 1989) is an Australian soccer player who most recently played for the Western Sydney Wanderers in the Australian W-League competition in the 2018–19 season, and with the Northern Tigers in the National Premier Leagues NSW Women’s competition.

Background
She was born in 1989 in Sydney to Turkish Australians Nilgün and Bulant Uzunlar.

Club career
Uzunlar played junior football for North Sutherland Rockets. The club now presents an annual award in her name to junior girls players who have improved their game over the year.

Uzunlar played for NSW Sapphires in the Women's National Soccer League (WNSL) in 2004.

Ahead of the 2008–09 W-League season, Uzunlar joined Sydney FC.

In 2010, she played with the Ottawa Fury.

Uzunlar signed for Californian team Pali Blues for the 2012 USL W-League season.

In October 2012, Uzunlar moved to Western Sydney Wanderers.

She scored the first goal in Western Sydney Wanderers history. In fact she scored the first two.

On 20 October 2012 against Adelaide United, the Wanderers played their maiden W-League game, with Uzunlar scoring in the sixth and 21st minutes.

Mark Bridge scored the Wanderer’s A-League team’s first goal a week later, meaning Uzunlar’s first goal was the club’s first ever goal.

After an ill-fated spell in Korea with Chungbuk Sportstoto, Uzunlar retired from football in 2013 at the age of 25. After a year out of the sport, she rejoined Sydney FC with the aim of playing in the 2015 FIFA Women's World Cup.

In October 2017, it was confirmed that Sydney FC had not re-signed Uzunlar for the 2017–18 W-League season, and after a year off she signed with the Western Sydney Wanderers for the 2018–19 W-League season, returning to the club that she played for from 2012 to 2014.

She won the Wanderers Medal as the team’s Best & Fairest winner, adding to her 2012/13 award.

She played 24 games overall for the Red & Black.

International career
Uzunlar was a member of the Australian squads that played at the 2006 FIFA U-20 Women's World Championship and the 2008 FIFA U-20 Women's World Cup. She made her senior debut for Australia in 2008, in a 5–0 loss to China.

At the 2011 FIFA Women's World Cup Uzaunlar played every minute of Australia's four games.

Uzunlar was named to Australia's 23-player quad for the 2015 Women's World Cup, she appeared in one game as Australia was eliminated in the quarter-finals.

International goals
Scores and results list Australia's goal tally first.

Honours

Club
Sydney FC
 W-League Premiership: 2009, 2010–11
 W-League Championship: 2009

Country
Australia
 AFC Women's Asian Cup: 2010
 AFF Women's Championship: 2008

Individual
 Sydney FC W-League Player of the Year: 2009
 Western Sydney Wanderers FC W-League Player of the Year: 2012–13

References

External links

 Sydney FC profile

1989 births
Living people
Australian women's soccer players
Sydney FC (A-League Women) players
2011 FIFA Women's World Cup players
Western Sydney Wanderers FC (A-League Women) players
Australian people of Turkish descent
2015 FIFA Women's World Cup players
Soccer players from Sydney
Australia women's international soccer players
Women's association football midfielders
Women's association football central defenders
Pali Blues players
Expatriate women's footballers in South Korea
Ottawa Fury (women) players
USL W-League (1995–2015) players
Australian expatriate sportspeople in Canada
Expatriate women's soccer players in Canada